Stoodley may refer to:

 Sarah Stoodley, Canadian politician
 Stoodley Pike, a hill in Northern England
 Stoodley, Tasmania,  a locality and small rural community in Australia

See also
 Stoodleigh, a village in Devon, England